A barebook computer (or barebone laptop) is an incomplete notebook PC.  A barebone laptop is similar to a barebone computer, but in a laptop form.

As it leaves the factory, it contains only elements strictly tied to the computer's design (case, motherboard, display, keyboard, pointing device, etc.), and the consumer or reseller has to add standardized off-the-shelf components such as CPU and GPU (when not integrated on the motherboard), memory, mass storage, WiFi card, etc. separately.

Because it is not manufactured with storage media such as harddisks or SSDs, a barebook does not typically include an operating system, which may make barebooks appealing to opposers of the bundling of Microsoft Windows.

References

See also 
 Barebone computer
 Homebuilt computer

Do it yourself
Laptops